4-Methoxybenzylthiol is an organosulfur compound with the formula CH3OC6H4CH2SH.  A colorless, odiferous oil, it is a reagent used as a protected thiol.

References

Thiols
Benzyl compounds
Foul-smelling chemicals